Asian Highway 18 is a highway route included in Asian Highway Network, running from Hat Yai in Thailand to Johor Bahru, Malaysia. Route AH18 runs along main eastern coastal road in southern Thailand and also along Federal Route 3 of Malaysia.

List of junctions, towns and cities

Thailand 
AH18 runs along Thailand National Route 43 from Hat Yai to Nong Chik, then Route 42 from Nong Chik to Narathiwat then Route 4084/4057 to Su Nhai Kolok.
 HAT YAI and Route AH2
 Chana
 Ban Lam Phai
 Khok Pho and route 409 
 Ban Bo Metchun
 Nong Chik
 PATTANI and Route 410 
 Yaring
 Sai Buri
 Bacho
 Ton Sai
 Yi Ngo
 NARATHIWAT
 Tak Bai
 Sungai Kolok
 (Malaysia - Thailand border)

Malaysia
 Kelantan
 Terengganu
 Pahang
 Johor

(see also Malaysia Federal Route 3, Kuantan Bypass, Kota Tinggi Bypass and Tebrau Highway)

Asian Highway Network